Same-sex marriage in Puerto Rico has been legal since July 13, 2015, as a result of the U.S. Supreme Court's decision in Obergefell v. Hodges. On June 26, 2015, the court ruled that bans on same-sex marriage are unconstitutional under the Due Process and Equal Protection clauses of the United States Constitution. Same-sex couples could begin applying for marriage licenses on July 13, and the first marriages occurred on July 17, 2015.

Governor Alejandro García Padilla announced that the commonwealth would comply with the Supreme Court's ruling within 15 days. The parties to the principal lawsuit challenging Puerto Rico's denial of marriage rights to same-sex couples jointly asked the First Circuit Court of Appeals to overturn the ruling of the Puerto Rican District Court that had upheld Puerto Rico's ban on same-sex marriage, which the appeals court did on July 8, 2015.

Background
On March 19, 1999, Governor Pedro Rosselló signed into law H.B. 1013, which defined marriage as "a civil contract whereby a man and a woman mutually agree to become husband and wife." Article 68 of the Civil Code also explicitly prohibited marriages "between persons of the same sex or transsexuals contracted in other jurisdictions" from being recognized in Puerto Rico. On June 1, 2020, Governor Wanda Vázquez Garced signed into law a new civil code that repealed article 68 and removed provisions banning same-sex marriage. The new code uses gender-neutral language with regards to married spouses, and ensures recognition of same-sex unions entered into in other jurisdictions. The code went into effect on November 28, 2020. Article 376 of the new code reads: Marriage is a civil institution, originating in a civil contract whereby two natural persons mutually agree to become spouses and to discharge toward each other the duties imposed by law.

During a debate on civil unions in 2007, Attorney General Roberto Sánchez Ramos said it might be unconstitutional to deny marriage rights to same-sex couples.

In 2008, the Senate of Puerto Rico passed a motion to organize a referendum that would have asked voters to amend Puerto Rico's Constitution to define marriage as a "union between a man and a woman", while also banning same-sex marriages, civil unions and domestic partnership benefits. Known as resolución 99 (resolution 99), the proposed referendum was not approved by the House of Representatives, after the legislative committee studying the proposal decided not to recommend its approval. A similar bill was defeated in 2009. In early January 2010, Governor Luis Fortuño suggested to a group of evangelical ministers that he favored amending the Puerto Rico Constitution to restrict marriage to the union of one man and one woman. Shortly afterwards, he categorically denied that he favored such a measure.

Conde-Vidal v. Garcia-Padilla

On March 25, 2014, two women residing in Puerto Rico, represented by Lambda Legal, filed a complaint in the U.S. District Court of Puerto Rico seeking recognition of their 2004 marriage in Massachusetts. They initially named as defendants in their suit, Conde-Vidal v. Rius-Amendariz, the Secretary of Health, Ana Ríus Armendáriz, later adding Governor Alejandro García Padilla and the treasury director, retitling the case to Conde-Vidal v. Garcia-Padilla.

The plaintiffs argued that Puerto Rico's marriage law denied them constitutional rights guaranteed under the Due Process and Equal Protection clauses of the United States Constitution. Four more couples joined as plaintiffs in June. On August 28, Christian Chaplains (Capellanes Internacionales Cristianos León de Judá) asked to be allowed to intervene in the suit on behalf of its eight members who reside in Puerto Rico. They claimed that if the court ruled for the plaintiffs they "will be obligated by law to marry same-sex couples." On October 17, Judge Juan M. Pérez-Giménez denied the group's request.

Judge Pérez-Giménez dismissed the plaintiff's lawsuit on October 21, 2014, ruling that the U.S. Supreme Court's ruling in the 1972 case of Baker v. Nelson prevented him from considering the plaintiffs' arguments. He concluded that Puerto Rico's definition of marriage did not conflict with the U.S. Constitution and that:

The plaintiffs appealed the decision to the First Circuit Court of Appeals. On March 20, 2015, the Puerto Rico Secretary of Justice, César Miranda, announced that the commonwealth would tell the First Circuit that it had decided that Puerto Rico's statute banning the licensing and recognition of same-sex marriage was legally indefensible. Governor García Padilla said that "legal developments in a number of American jurisdictions point to an undeniable consensus" against the discrimination found in Puerto Rico's statutes with respect to the right of same-sex couples to marry. Puerto Rico's brief said that Baker v. Nelson was no longer controlling, that "Puerto Rico's marriage ban must be examined through heightened scrutiny", and that "the Commonwealth cannot responsibly advance ... any interest sufficiently important or compelling to justify the differentiated treatment afforded to same-sex couples". It asked the First Circuit to reverse the judgment of the District Court.

On April 14, 2015, the First Circuit suspended proceedings until after a ruling from the U.S. Supreme Court on marriage cases it was considering on appeal from the Sixth Circuit Court of Appeals. The court asked the parties to file a proposed schedule for further proceedings in Conde-Vidal within 14 days of the Supreme Court's decision. The Supreme Court ruled in Obergefell v. Hodges on June 26, 2015 that the Fourteenth Amendment guarantees same-sex couples the right to marry. That same day, all parties to Conde-Vidal asked the First Circuit to overrule the District Court's decision as soon as possible. Governor García Padilla said he would issue an executive order requiring all Puerto Rican government agencies to implement the Obergefell ruling within 15 days. The first same-sex couples began applying for marriage licenses on July 13, 2015, and the first marriages took place on July 17. Among the first couples to marry were Yolanda Arroyo Pizarro and Zulma Oliveras Vega, plaintiffs in Conde-Vidal, who married in Santurce, San Juan on July 17. A group of lawmakers from the New Progressive Party filed a last-ditch attempt to block the recognition and issuing of marriage licenses to same-sex couples, but the Puerto Rico Supreme Court dismissed the measure on July 16, ruling that "Puerto Rico cannot refuse to recognize marriages between people of the same sex. This is the current law.".

The First Circuit ruled in the case on July 8, 2015, overturning the territory's statutory ban on same-sex marriage and remanding the case back to the District Court. On March 8, 2016, Judge Pérez-Giménez ruled that the U.S. Supreme Court's ruling in Obergefell v. Hodges did not apply to Puerto Rico, and so upheld the ban on same-sex marriage, in conflict with the First Circuit's directions. In response, Governor García Padilla said he would respect the rulings of superior courts which have struck down same-sex marriage bans, ensuring same-sex marriages continue in Puerto Rico. An appeal of Judge Pérez-Giménez's ruling was promptly lodged with the First Circuit, which on April 8, 2016 issued an unsigned opinion rejecting the lower court's ruling and granted the request from the parties challenging the ban that the appeals court issue an order "requiring the district court to enter judgment in their favor striking down the ban as unconstitutional." The First Circuit also ordered that the case "be assigned randomly by the clerk to a different judge (of the lower court) to enter judgment in favor of the Petitioners promptly." On April 11, 2016, Judge Gustavo Gelpí of the Puerto Rican District Court issued a declaratory judgement striking down Puerto Rico's same-sex marriage ban as unconstitutional and declaring that any marriage of a same-sex couple performed in the territory since the U.S. Supreme Court's decision in Obergefell be fully recognized by government agencies and officials.

Two-spirit marriages
Literature about two-spirit individuals among the Taíno is limited. It is possible that Taíno society did have a designation like two-spirit, but a lot of traditional knowledge was lost during colonization and the adoption of Christianity. "Pre-contact Taíno culture was not particularly well documented by the Spanish, and its lack of a written record of its own means that, when Spain severed institutional continuity in Taíno society, it was able to cut [it] off from a large chunk of [its] own past." Some historians argue that there were  male-bodied people who were identified by the fact that they wore naguas, a small cotton apron usually reserved for married women. This term used for these people is eierí-i’naru’, and it is possible that they occupied a traditional third gender role in the community. Some Taíno revivalist groups have adopted the two-spirit concept, while others continue to acknowledge the Catholic mores that now dominate Puerto Rico. It is unknown if such two-spirit individuals were able to marry in pre-colonial Taíno society. They might have been spouses in polygynous households.

Demographics and marriage statistics
Data from the 2010 U.S. census showed that 6,614 same-sex couples were living in Puerto Rico. Same-sex partners were on average younger than opposite-sex partners, at 39.5 years old compared to 53.3 years old, and 97% of same-sex partners were Latino compared to 98.8% of opposite-sex partners. 15% of same-sex couples in Puerto Rico were raising children under the age of 18, with an estimated 1,269 children living in households headed by same-sex couples.

According to the Puerto Rico Department of Health, approximately 260 same-sex couples married from July to December 2015. 422 same-sex couples had married by June 2016.

261 same-sex marriages occurred in 2015, of which 96 (36.8%) were between male couples and 165 (63.2%) were between lesbian couples. 637 same-sex marriages were performed in 2016: 271 (42.5%) between male couples and 366 (57.5%) between lesbian couples. In total, same-sex marriages represented 1.5% and 4.0% of all marriages performed those two years. Compared to heterosexual unions, partners in same-sex marriages were older when getting married, especially in 2015, when an estimated 20-30% of same-sex marriages involved partners over the age of 55 (compared to about 10% for heterosexual couples).

Public opinion
According to a Pew Research Center survey conducted between November 7, 2013 and February 28, 2014, 33% of Puerto Ricans supported same-sex marriage, while 55% were opposed.

See also
LGBT rights in Puerto Rico
Pedro Julio Serrano
Same-sex marriage in the United States
Recognition of same-sex unions in the Americas

Notes

References

2015 in LGBT history
LGBT rights in Puerto Rico
Puerto Rico